Garra longchuanensis is a species of cyprinid fish in the genus Garra endemic to the Yiluowadi Jiang in China.

References 

Garra
Fish described in 2016